István Molnár can refer to:

 István Molnár (chess player) (1933-2015), Hungarian chess player
 István Molnár (painter) (1968-1993), Hungarian painter
 István Molnár (volleyball) (1937-1999), Hungarian volleyball player
 István Molnár (water polo) (1913-1983), Hungarian water polo player